Norway was represented by Kate Gulbrandsen, with the song "Mitt liv", at the 1987 Eurovision Song Contest, which took place on 9 May in Brussels. "Mitt liv" was chosen as the Norwegian entry at the Melodi Grand Prix on 28 February.

Before Eurovision

Melodi Grand Prix 1987 
The MGP was held at the Château Neuf in Oslo, hosted by Eldbjørg Vaage. Ten songs took part in the final, with the winner chosen by voting from seven regional juries. Other participants included 1981 Norwegian entrant Finn Kalvik and Tor Endresen, making the first of seven appearances at MGP before finally being successful on his eighth attempt in 1997.

At Eurovision 
On the night of the final Gulbrandsen performed first in the running order, preceding Israel. At the close of voting "Mitt liv" had picked up 65 points (the highest a 10 from Sweden), placing Norway 9th of the 22 entries. The Norwegian jury awarded its 12 points to Yugoslavia.

Voting

References

External links 
Full national final on nrk.no

1987
Countries in the Eurovision Song Contest 1987
1987
Eurovision
Eurovision